Järfälla Sim is a swimming club with water polo team from the municipality of Järfälla north of Stockholm, Sweden, and has been among the leading teams of Swedish water polo on the women's side for the last decade. In May 2010 both the men's and women's teams won the Swedish championship. This was the fourth championship for the women's team and the first ever for the men's team.

References

Swimming clubs in Sweden
Water polo clubs in Sweden